Cleveland District State High School is an independent coeducational public secondary school based in Cleveland in the local government area of Redland City in Queensland, Australia. In August 2020, the school had a total enrolment of 2120 students.

Cleveland District State High School's current role of Executive Principal is held by Leonard McKeown. The school also consists of five Deputy Principals, nine Heads of Department and five Deans of Students.

History

In January 1956, Cleveland District State High School began operating in the grounds of Cleveland State School as the first secondary school in the Redland City area. The school had a population of 32 students and was led by Head Teacher Ted Liesegang. By 1960, the school had reached a total population of 54 students, followed by 84 in the following year. In order to meet the growing demands of the school, new school facilities were constructed on land in Russell Street in the early 1960s. The school was officially opened by the State Treasurer, Sir Thomas Hiley,  on 27 April 1963.

The 2010s decade saw a substantial increase in enrolments at the school, with an official count of 2040 students in 2018 compared with 1205 students in 2010. In 2018, Cleveland District State High School became the first school in the Redland City area with a total enrolment of more than 2000 students.

Sporting houses

Cleveland State High School includes the following four sporting houses, all of which are named in reference to islands in Moreton Bay, and their respective colours:

Curriculum

Excellence programs

Excellence programs at Cleveland District State High School include:
 Athlete Support Program
 Creative Arts Centre for Excellence
 Languages
 Music Extension Program
 Sports Development Program

English

English is a compulsory core subject across the Junior Secondary (Years 7–9) curriculum. English subjects available to students in the Senior Secondary phase (Years 10–12) include the General subjects of English and Literature, and the Applied subject of Essential English.

Mathematics

Mathematics is a compulsory core subject across the Junior Secondary curriculum. Mathematics subjects available to students in the Senior Secondary phase include the General subjects of General Mathematics, Mathematical Methods and Specialist Mathematics, and the applied subject of Essential Mathematics.

Humanities

The subjects of History and Geography are administered through the Humanities faculty as compulsory core subjects across the Junior Secondary curriculum. From Year 9, the elective subject of Ancient History becomes available. Humanities subjects available to students in the Senior Secondary phase include the General subjects of Ancient History, Geography and Modern History.

Science

Science is a compulsory core subject across the Junior Secondary curriculum. In Year 9, each student participates in either of the core subjects of Agricultural Science or General Science, and the elective subjects of Agricultural Practices, Animal Husbandry and Science, Technology, Engineering & Mathematics (STEM) are available. Science subjects available to students in the Senior Secondary phase include the General subjects of Agricultural Science, Biology, Chemistry, Marine Science and Physics, and the Applied subjects of Agricultural Practices and Science in Practice.

Languages

Chinese, French and Japanese are the three Languages Other Than English administered at Cleveland District State High School. All students in Years 7 and 8 study one of these languages and from Year 9, they become elective subjects.

Health & Physical Education

Health & Physical Education is a compulsory core subject across the Junior Secondary curriculum. Instead of this subject, academy students participate in the Sports Development Excellence Program subjects of Football, Touch Football and Volleyball. In Year 9, the elective subject of Recreation Studies is also available. Health & Physical Education subjects available to students in the Senior Secondary phase include the General subjects of Health Education and Physical Education, and the Applied subject of Sport & Recreation.

Business Education

All students in Years 7 and 8 have access to Business Education subjects over the two-year period. In Year 9, Business Education subjects are studied as elective subjects, which include Business, Business Computing, Digital Solutions and Information & Communication Technology. Business Education subjects available to students in the Senior Secondary phase include the General subjects of Accounting, Business, Digital Solutions, Economics and Legal Studies, and the Applied subjects of Business Studies, Information & Communication Technology and Tourism.

Creative Arts

All students in Years 7 and 8 have access to Creative Arts subjects over the two-year period. In Year 9, Creative Arts subjects are studied as elective subjects, which include Dance, Drama, Media Arts in Practice, Music, Music in Practice, Visual Art and Visual Arts in Practice. Creative Arts subjects available to students in the Senior Secondary phase include the General subjects of Dance, Drama, Music, Music Extension (Year 12 only), Visual Art and Film, Television & New Media, and the Applied subjects of Media Arts in Practice, Music in Practice and Visual Arts in Practice.

Technology

All students in Years 7 and 8 have access to Technology subjects over the two-year period. In Year 9, Technology subjects are studied as elective subjects, which include Applied Industrial Skills, Design, Food & Nutrition, Hospitality, Industrial Graphics, Metal Technology, Practical Textiles & Cookery and Wood Technology. Technology subjects available to students in the Senior Secondary phase include the General subjects of Design and Food & Nutrition, and the Applied subjects of Building & Construction Skills, Early Childhood & Education, Engineering Skills, Furnishing Skills, Hospitality Practices and Industrial Graphics Skills.

Notable alumni
 Ben Ely from the band Regurgitator 
Emily Gielnik, association football player

References

External links
 

Public high schools in Queensland
Schools in South East Queensland
Cleveland, Queensland
Educational institutions established in 1956
1956 establishments in Australia
Buildings and structures in Redland City